The 2018 Grand Prix Alanya was the 1st edition of the Grand Prix Alanya road cycling one day race. It was part of UCI Europe Tour in category 1.2.

Teams
Twenty teams were invited to take part in the race. These included one UCI Professional Continental team, sixteen UCI Continental teams and three national teams.

Result

References

Grand Prix Alanya
2018 UCI Europe Tour
2018 in Turkish sport